Madrid–Waddington Central School, often shortened to MWCS, is a public school consisting of both elementary school and high school located in Madrid, New York. It is a small, rural district located in St. Lawrence County on State Highway 345 between the communities of Madrid and Waddington, New York. MWCS has an enrollment of approximately 650 students in Pre-Kindergarten through twelfth grade. Eric Burke is the current Superintendent of Schools. The Board of Education consists of nine members who are elected by the residents of the district. These members are Andy Bracy, Richard Hobkirk, Brian Hammond, Gerald Molnar (Vice President), Tina Wilson Bush, Jordan Walker, Matthew O'Bryan (Board President), Katie Logan, and Charles Grant. MWCS is a PK (pre-kindergarten)- twelfth grade school. It is divided into two sections, the elementary being split by a fourth lobby in the center of it. The HS lobby is next to the HS cafeteria (looks a bit like a greenhouse) and the elementary has a huge skylight. The third lobby is next to the auditorium. Pre-K, JK, and kindergarten is the pre-school, first-fifth grades are the elementary, sixth- eighth are middle school, and ninth-twelfth is high school. While the elementary Schools of Madrid and Waddington had merged in 1991,the High School was established in 1959.  There are several events a year, including numerous dances and assemblies. The district includes Chase Mills, Madrid, Waddington, and parts of Lisbon and Potsdam, and a few students coming from as far as Canton.

References 

Public elementary schools in New York (state)
Public high schools in New York (state)
Schools in St. Lawrence County, New York
Public middle schools in New York (state)
School districts established in 1991